Yasukazu  is a masculine Japanese given name.

Possible writings
Yasukazu can be written using many different combinations of kanji characters. Here are some examples:

靖一, "peaceful, one"
靖和, "peaceful, harmony"
靖多, "peaceful, many"
康和, "healthy, harmony"
康一, "healthy, one"
康数, "healthy, number"
安和, "tranquil, harmony"
安多, "tranquil, many"
保一, "preserve, one"
保和, "preserve, harmony"
保多, "preserve, many"
泰和, "peaceful, harmony"
泰一, "peaceful, one"
八洲和, "8, continent, harmony"
易和, "divination, harmony"

The name can also be written in hiragana やすかず or katakana ヤスカズ.

Notable people with the name
, Japanese politician
, Japanese footballer

Japanese masculine given names